The 100 known most prolific inventors based on worldwide utility patents are shown in the following table. While in many cases this is the number of utility patents granted by the United States Patent and Trademark Office, it may include utility patents granted by other countries, as noted by the source references for an inventor.

Prolific Inventors 

This table is usually updated every Tuesday evening in US Eastern time, and is current .

The columns are defined as follows:
 Inventor: The name of the inventor.
 Pats: The number of utility patents that have been issued. Only utility patents (or the international equivalent) are listed, as a utility patent is a patent for an invention. Not all patents are for inventions. Other patent types include: design patents for the ornamental design of an object; plant patents for plant varieties; and reissue patents, where a correction is made to an already granted patent. This list does not include patent applications (patents pending) as there is no guarantee that a patent application actually describes a novel invention until the patent is granted.
 Fams: The number of patent families, which in USPTO data includes an original or continuation-in-part patent by itself or with one or more continuation or divisional patents based on the original or continuation-in-part patent. This is different than global patent families that represent a patent filed in more than one jurisdiction. "NA" signifies the inventor was active prior to digital records.
 Fam %: The percentage of original and continuation-in-part patents that are in the inventor's patent portfolio [Fams column divided by Pats column, rounded to first decimal as a percentage]. "NA" signifies the inventor was active prior to digital records.
 Pat Yrs: The first and last year in which an inventor received a patent issuance.
 Yrs: The number of years from first issuance to most recent issuance, rounded to first decimal based on dates.
 Pats /Yr: The average number of patents received per year [Pats column divided by Yrs column, rounded].
 Inv / Pat: The average number of inventors listed on the inventor's most recent 50 patents  or on the date the inventor was added to the table if later. "NA" signifies the inventor was active prior to digital records.
 Pat Residence: The country of inventor's residence listed in their most recent patent issuance.
 Majority Assignment: The entity that has the most patents assigned from an inventor's portfolio. This is current and not original assignment. It is usually, but not always an indication of which company the inventor worked at for the majority of their patent activity.

Significance of inventions 
This table is a sortable list of the most prolific inventors as measured by utility patents granted. It does not include other types of invention, such as inventions that were never applied for nor granted, for which there is no known source. Nor does the table attempt to measure the significance of an inventor and their inventions. The significance of inventions is often not apparent until many decades after the invention has been made. For recent inventors, it is not yet possible to determine their place in history.

Various published lists 
Rankings of prolific inventors have been published at various times. However, until the patent records were digitized, these lists were very tedious to prepare, as many thousands of patent records had to be checked manually. Even after digitization, it is still not a simple process. While the USPTO keeps statistics for annual rankings of inventions assigned to companies, it no longer publishes rankings of individual inventors. The last such list was published by the USPTO in 1998. Also, patents predating 1976 have not yet been digitized in the USPTO records. This means that patents before 1976 will not be included in a USPTO search by inventor name, and the number of patents granted before 1976 must be added to current searches.

See also 
Timeline of historic inventions
List of inventors
List of top United States patent recipients

References

References of Inventors' Patents 

Science-related lists
Lists of inventors